Sergio Flamigni (born 22 October 1925) is an Italian politician and writer. A member of the Italian Communist Party (PCI), he took part in the Italian Parliament's investigative commissions on the murder of Aldo Moro, the Propaganda Due scandal and on mafia.

Biography
Flamigni was born in Forlì on 22 October 1925. He began his political activity in 1941, as a member of a clandestine group of young anti-fascists in his hometown, and subsequently entered the Communist Party. In 1943 he was named secretary of the communist youth movement in Forlì and became a member of the party's clandestine committee in the city. He fought as partisan in the Italian resistance movement against the German occupation.

In 1952 he was appointed as secretary of CGIL (Italy's left main trade union) in Forlì, and later he became secretary of the local section of PCI. In 1959 he was elected into the party's national central committee, and, in the following year, regional coordinator for Emilia-Romagna. He was also a member of the city council of Forlì from 1956 to 1960, and of the provincial council from 1960 until 1964.

He was elected to the Italian Chamber of Deputies in 1968, remaining a member until 1979, when he became a Senator. Flamigni worked in the Parliament's commissions on mafia, the kidnapping of Aldo Moro and the Propaganda Due secret lodge, and wrote several books about these arguments.

Works
La resistenza in Romagna (with Luciano Marzocchi, 1969)
Sicurezza democratica e lotta alla criminalità (with Malagugini, Perna, Spagnoli, Terracini; 1975)
Gastone Sozzi e il Partito Comunista in Romagna (1980)
La tela del ragno. Il delitto Moro (1988; 5th edition 2003)
Trame atlantiche. Storia della Loggia massonica segreta P2 (1996; second edition 2005)
«Il mio sangue ricadrà su di loro». Gli scritti di Aldo Moro prigioniero delle Br (1997)
Convergenze parallele. Le Brigate rosse, i servizi segreti e il delitto Moro (1998)
Il covo di Stato. Via Gradoli 96 e il delitto Moro (1999)
I fantasmi del passato. La carriera politica di Francesco Cossiga (2001)
La sfinge delle Brigate Rosse. Delitti, segreti e bugie del capo terrorista Mario Moretti (2004)
Dossier Pecorelli (2004)
Le idi di marzo. Il delitto Moro secondo Mino Pecorelli (2006)
Il sequestro di verità. I buchi neri del delitto Moro (with Roberto Bartali, Giuseppe De Lutiis, Ilaria Moroni, Lorenzo Ruggiero; 2008)

External links 
Biography at Italian Partisans National Association 
Website with the archives collected by Sergio Flamigni on the Moro affair, Propaganda 2 and mafia 
Italian Parliament Page
Italian Senate Page

References

1925 births
Living people
People from Forlì
Italian Communist Party politicians
Italian male writers
Italian partisans
Deputies of Legislature V of Italy
Deputies of Legislature VI of Italy
Deputies of Legislature VII of Italy
Senators of Legislature VIII of Italy
Senators of Legislature IX of Italy